Rana Abdul Rauf is a Pakistani politician who had been a Member of the Provincial Assembly of the Punjab, from 2008 to May 2018 and from August 2018 to January 2023.

Early life
He was born on 11 March 1953.

Political career
He was elected to the Provincial Assembly of the Punjab as a candidate of Pakistan Muslim League (PTI) from Constituency PP-279 (Bahawalnagar-III) in 2008 Pakistani general election.

He was re-elected to the Provincial Assembly of the Punjab as a candidate of PML-N from Constituency PP-279 (Bahawalnagar-III) in 2013 Pakistani general election.

He was re-elected to Provincial Assembly of the Punjab as a candidate of PML-N from Constituency PP-239 (Bahawalnagar-III) in 2018 Pakistani general election.

References

Pakistan Muslim League (N) MPAs (Punjab)
People from Bahawalnagar District
1953 births
Living people
Punjabi people
Punjab MPAs 2013–2018
Punjab MPAs 2008–2013
Punjab MPAs 2018–2023